Malakand District is a district in Malakand Division of Khyber Pakhtunkhwa province in Pakistan.

The District was formed in 1970 as a Provincially Administered Tribal Area, It had previously been a tribal area known as the Malakand Protected Area, part of the Malakand Agency.  From 1970 the district became part of Malakand Division.

Malakand District lies in a strategically important position as it acts as a gateway to Bajaur, Lower Dir, Swat and Bunair. It is surrounded by mountains that were overgrown with different kinds of trees in the past, though they have a barren look today. The Malakand Pass which connects Mardan to Swat and Dir is located near Dargai, a site where the local Pushtun tribes fought two fierce battles with the Imperial British Army in 1895 and 1897.

The Swat River flows through the district down towards Charsadda District where it falls into the Kabul River. Malakand District is bounded in the north by Lower Dir District, in the east by Swat District, in the south east and south west by Mardan and Charsadda districts respectively and in the west by Mohmand and Bajaur agencies. The area of Malakand protected area is 952 km2.

Geography 
The soil of Malakand is loamy and moist, and is irrigated by the Swat River which flows down from Swat, passing through Swat ranizai and joins the river Kabul near Charsadda. The average rainfall is not enough, therefore the soil requires artificial irrigation.

There are rare scenic places and tourist resorts in Malakand like Jabban and Malakand hydro-electric project. Water passes through a three-mile-long tunnel, and has a natural fall of 350 feet. The main income-generating source in Malakand is the two power houses at Dargai and Malakand Khas. There are about 11 other suitable sites for construction of Small Hydel Power projects that needed investors attention.

Malakand as already mentioned is surrounded by high mountains rich with mineral resources. deposits of chromite iron, china clay and fuller earth have been found in Malakand.

History

Historic ruins, founded at different places in the agency, indicate that this area was part of Gandhara civilization and Buddhist peoples lived here.

In the 12the century, Muhammad Ghori, invaded the area and Islam began to spread there. The Yousafzai Pashtun tribe came to inhabit this area in the wake of the invasion. About 400 years ago, successive Mughal rulers attempted in vain to capture this area. After the fall of the Mughals, Sikh rulers tried to conquer this area but were repulsed. The British had always looked at this area with covetous eyes but dared no venture to flirt with it openly. In 1882, The British approached to the elders of Malakand Agency with the request to allow the passage of post to Chitral, which was then in the Administrative sphere of Gilgit. In 1885, the Chitral Expedition necessitated the British intervention in this area. British officer and troops had been besieged in Chitral by Chitralis. To reinforce their forces there, they needed a route to Chitral as the Gilgit-Chitral road, the only route at that time, was covered with snow and they had no option left except to pass through Malakand Agency. The British therefore laid siege of the Malakand Pass. The people fought bravely and offered stubborn resistance to the enemy. The British artillery particularly proving more than a match for the old and rusty guns and swords of the natives. To fortify their position and ensure the safety of the strategically Important Chitral road, they constructed two forts at Malakand and Chakdara, and many pickets in the surrounding hills. One of them, Churchill's Picket, was named after Lt. Churchill who later on became the Prime Minister of Britain. Since then the British intervened in the politics of the area. A political agent was stationed at Malakand to mediate between the British and the people of the area.

Administration

National assembly
This district is represented by one elected MNA (Member of National Assembly) in Pakistan National Assembly. Its constituency is NA-35.

Provincial Assembly 

The district of Malakand is divided into two Tehsils:

1. Swat Ranizai (Batkhela):

Batkhela is the main tehsil and capital of Malakand District. During the era of Ashoka and Kanishka Batkhela was ruled by a leader named Butt hence the city has been given the name Batkhela. According to the 1998 census, the population of Batkhela is 38,222, and it is estimated to be 39,703 according to the World Gazetteer. This valley is covered by tall hills from all sides and there are many fast-flowing rivers in the area. One water canal that pours into a small dam in Jaban area is the main source of electricity production.

Batkhela main bazaar is more than 3 kilometers long; there are no intersections (junctions) so no traffic lights. Therefore, it is the longest bazaar that has no traffic lights or junctions 
(intersections) on it.

2. Sama Ranizai (Dargai):

Dargai is one of the tehsils of Malakand District. Dargai is located on main N-45 highway from Nowshera to Pulchokai N-95 Swat, Dir(L), Dir(U) and Chitral. Most of the Conquerors, Traders tourists going to these areas had to take Dargai, Batkhela route so business flourished in Dargai and Batkhela. Due to recent law and order situation tourists going to Swat have considerably decreased affecting people's business here. Dargai is known for its Timber Market and Batkhela for its wholesale Market.

Dargai and Batkhela are known for their battles during British rule. The British commenced their campaign against Malakand in 1853 and spread its sphere of influence to the whole Malakand since then.

There are rare scenic places and tourist resorts in Dargai like Jabban and Malakand hydro-electric project. Water passes through a three-mile long tunnel, and has a natural fall of 350 feet. There are two power houses at Dargai and Malakand Khas. A third power plant of 81MW has recently been constructed in Dargai on Wartair side. Dargai is also home to Punjab Regminent Centre located Near Dargai Railway Station.

Media 
There are several cable operators which provide channels with one or two video channels. Manend Media is a recent addition to the media of Pakhtunkhwa and Malakand. It currently runs a News Paper Manend Aaina, a Web TV Manend TV, a Radio Channel Manend Radio and a Social Madia. It is also called Manend News Paper, Manend Akhbar, News Paper of Malakand,News Paper of Pakhtunkhwa Manend e Aaina, The Mirror, Manend TV, Manend Radio etc. This news paper has an online epaper with the name of Manend Epaper.

Demographics 
At the time of the 2017 census the district had a population of 717,806, of which 360,440 were males and 357,333 females. Rural population was 650,120 (90.57%) while the urban population was 67,686 (9.43%). The literacy rate was 61.83% - the male literacy rate was 74.45% while the female literacy rate was 49.45%. 471 people in the district were from religious minorities. Pashto was the predominant language, spoken by 98.38% of the population.

Utmankhel is the largest Pashtun tribe living in malakand with about 65%. A part of Malakand is occupied by the Yousufzai clan of Pashtuns, while towards the south, at the bottom of Malakand Pass, live the Ranizais known as Sam Ranizai. Dargai and Sakhakot are well known town in Sama Ranizai. Those living beyond the pass towards Swat are Swat Ranizai. This is also evident in the administration division; where one is called the Swat Ranizai and the other as Sam Ranizai. There are also migrants from Ghazni, Afghanistan living in Shingray near Shergarh which are the Jalalzai tribe of the Pashtuns. District Malakand has boundaries, to east Palay with Mardan District, to south Shergarh with Mardan District, south east Bangla Harichand with Charsadda District, to west Prang Ghar with Mohmand Agency and Selay Pate with Bajaur Agency, north west Chakdara with Lower Dir District and Swat to north.

The control of law and order within the Malakand District lies with a paramilitary force called Malakand Levies which is modelled after the Malakand Field Force of British times.

References

External links
Khyber.org website: Malakand

 
Districts of Khyber Pakhtunkhwa